The 2017–18 season was Hull City's first season back in the Championship following their relegation the last season in their 114th year in existence. Along with the Championship, the club competed in the FA Cup and EFL Cup.
The season covered the period from 1 July 2017 to 30 June 2018.

Events
 On 9 June 2017, the club announced the appointment of Leonid Slutsky as head coach.
 On 30 June 2017, Liam Edwards signed a one-year deal, on a free transfer from Swansea City.
 On 3 July 2017, Jonathan Edwards signed a new one-year deal with the club and was loaned to Accrington Stanley for the season.
 On 5 July 2017, Josh Tymon was released after failing to agree a new contract with the club.
 On 11 July 2017 Ola Aina of Chelsea signed a season-long loan with the club.
 On 15 July 2017, Tom Huddlestone joined Derby County for an undisclosed fee, on a two-year contract.
 On 18 July 2017, free agent Fraizer Campbell signed a two-year deal with the club.
 On 19 July 2017, Eldin Jakupović signed a three-year deal with Leicester City for an undisclosed fee.
 On 19 July 2017, Ahmed Elmohamady joined Aston Villa on a three-year contract for a fee of £1 million.
 On 21 July 2017, Andrew Robertson moved to Liverpool for an initial fee of £8 million, in a reverse move Kevin Stewart signed a three-year deal with Hull City for an undisclosed fee.
On 26 July 2017, Ondřej Mazuch of Sparta Prague signed a two-year contract with the club after impressing in pre-season trials with the club. Also Callum Burton arrived from Shrewsbury Town signing a one-year contract for an undisclosed fee.
On 27 July 2017, Michael Hector joined on a season-long loan from Chelsea.
On 9 August 2017, signed Sebastian Larsson on a one-year contract following his release from Sunderland at the end of the 2016–17 season.
On 23 August 2017, Sam Clucas signed a 4-year deal with Swansea City for an undisclosed fee, in a reverse move Stephen Kingsley signed a 3-year deal, with an optional extra year for an undisclosed fee.
On 24 August 2017, Jon Toral signed a three-year deal with the club.
On 29 August 2017, Nouha Dicko, of Wolverhampton Wanderers, signed a 3-year deal, with an optional extra year for an undisclosed fee.
On 30 August 2017, Jackson Irvine, of Burton Albion,  signed a 3-year deal, with an optional extra year for an undisclosed fee.
On transfer dead-line day, 31 August 2017, Fikayo Tomori signed a season-long loan deal from Chelsea.
In September 2017, Jarrod Bowen signed a new contract with the club that sees him stay at the club until 2020.
On 12 October 2017, Oleg Yarovinsky was appointed Head of Club Strategy.
On 27 October 2017, Daniel Batty went on a month-long loan to FC Halifax Town.
On 3 November 2017, Callum Burton went on a month-long loan to Salford City.
On 8 November 2017, Josh Clackstone went on a month-long loan to FC Halifax Town.
On 24 November 2017, Adam Curry went on a month-long loan to Boston United.
On 28 November 2017, Will Mannion went on an emergency week-long loan to Plymouth Argyle.
On 3 December 2017, Leonid Slutsky and Oleg Yarovinsky left the club by mutual consent after a run of bad results.
On 7 December 2017, Nigel Adkins was appointed as head coach on an 18-month contract, Andy Crosby was appointed as his assistant.
On 5 January 2018, Jonathan Edwards was recalled from his season-long loan to Accrington Stanley and was immediately loaned out for the remainder of the season to Woking.
On 22 January 2018, goalkeeping coach Pat Mountain left the club for family reasons, taking up a similar position at Forest Green Rovers.
On 26 January 2018, Barry Richardson was appointed goalkeeping coach.
On 31 January 2018, Angus MacDonald signed from Barnsley on a two-and-a-half-year deal for an undisclosed fee. 
On 31 January 2018, Harry Wilson joined on loan from Liverpool for the remainder of the season.
On 13 February 2018, it was announced that Ryan Mason would retire from playing, on medical grounds, with immediate effect. Mason had suffered a fractured skull that required surgery after a clash of heads with defender Gary Cahill on 22 January 2017, in a Premier League match against Chelsea.
 On 28 February 2018, Brandon Fleming moved to Gainsborough Trinity on a month-long loan.
 On 28 February 2018, Tyler Hamilton and Robbie McKenzie signed two-year contracts with the club.
 On 2 March 2018, Academy player Billy Chadwick signed a professional contract with the club for one-year.
 On 16 March 2018, Ben Hinchliffe went on loan to Gainsborough Trinity until the end of April 2018.
 On 19 March 2018, Greg Luer joined Maidstone United on loan until the end of the season.
 On 18 April 2018, Brian Lenihan announced his retirement from football, and was released from his contract with the club.
 On 2 May 2018, Adama Diomande's contract was cancelled so he could join Los Angeles.
 On 16 May 2018, Allan McGregor chose not to sign a contract extension with the club, instead signing a two-year deal with Rangers.
 On 18 May 2018, Adam Curry and Lewis Ritson signed one-year deals with the club.
 On 18 May 2018, Josh Clackstone, Greg Luer, David Meyler and Greg Olley were released by the club, while Max Clark, Abel Hernández, Sebastian Larsson and Moses Odubajo were offered new deals.
 On 30 May 2018, Michael Dawson left for Nottingham Forest on a free transfer.
 On 4 June 2018, Abel Hernández left the club by mutual consent.
 On 11 June 2018, Sebastian Larsson rejected a new contract offer deciding to return to Sweden to play for AIK.
 On 22 June 2018, defender Eric Lichaj signed a two-year deal with Hull City for an undisclosed fee.
 On 22 June 2018, Max Clark was reported as joining Vitesse Arnhem at the end of his contract.

First team squad

Transfers

Transfers in

Transfers out

Loans in

Loans out

Pre-season
On 6 July 2017 Hull City announced five pre-season friendlies against Oxford United, Bristol Rovers, both in Portugal, Nantes, Benfica and Ajax.

The players returned to pre-season training on 3 July 2017. On 11 July 2017 the team travelled to Portugal for a 12-day training camp.

Competitions

Overall

Championship

League table

Result summary

Results by matchday

Matches
The fixtures for the season were announced on 21 June 2017. Hull start the season with a trip to Aston Villa, run by former manager Steve Bruce, on 5 August 2017. The season will close on 6 May 2018 with an away match at Brentford.

EFL Cup

Hull City enter the competition in the second-round. The draw for the second-round took place on 10 August 2017, and Hull were drawn away to Doncaster Rovers. The match was played on 22 August 2017 at the Keepmoat Stadium and Hull fielded a mainly Academy side for the match. The first half produced no goals and it was Alfie May who broke the deadlock just after the restart for Doncaster. Tommy Rowe doubled Doncaster's lead 6-minutes later with Hull failing to make any reply. Hull City were knocked out at the Second round stage losing 2–0 on the night.

FA Cup

Hull City entered the competition in the third-round, the draw for which took place on 4 December 2017. Hull were drawn away to either Blackburn Rovers or Crewe Alexandra, who drew their second-round match 3–3. The replay was scheduled for 12 December 2017 but was put back 24-hours because of adverse weather conditions. Blackburn Rovers beat Crewe Alexandra by a single goal, by former City player Danny Graham, to progress to play Hull City.

The match against Blackburn Rovers, took place on 6 January 2018 at Ewood Park, in what the BBC described as an "uneventful" match. The only goal coming in the 58th minute when Ola Aina headed in a Jon Toral corner to take Hull through to the next round.

The draw for the fourth-round took place on 8 January 2018, and Hull were drawn at home to fellow Championship side Nottingham Forest,
with the match taking place on 27 January 2018. Jarrod Bowen hit the post for Hull after 17-minutes, but was on the scoreboard a minute later when his shot hit the top corner of the goal. Nouha Dicko double the score when he headed in from close range after 40-minutes. With a couple of minutes of normal-time remaining Apostolos Vellios pegged one back for Forest, but they could not find another goal. Hull progressed to the Fifth round with a 2–1 victory.

The draw for the fifth-round took place on 29 January 2018, and Hull were drawn away to Chelsea. The match was later set for 16 February 2018, and would be using the Video Assistant Referee system. Hull wore shirts sporting a logo remembering the 50th anniversary of the Hull triple trawler tragedy, these were presented to charities involved with creating a memorial to the tragedy before the Millwall match on 6 March 2018. Willian got the game off to a good start for Chelsea by scoring after 2-minutes. Pedro doubled the score after 27-minutes. Willian was in the action again 5-minutes later with his second goal and Olivier Giroud got Chelsea's fourth just before the break. In the second half Harry Wilson was fouled in the penalty area by Cesc Fàbregas. David Meyler took the spot-kick for Hull, but this was saved by Willy Caballero. Both teams had chances to score in the second-half but the score remained 4–0 to Chelsea.

Statistics

Appearances

|-
|colspan="12"|Players who played for Hull City but subsequently left the club:

Note: Appearances shown after a "+" indicate player came on during course of match.

Disciplinary record

Top scorers

Kits
The home kit for the 2017–18 season was unveiled on 6 July 2017 at the Streetlife Museum of Transport. Manufactured by Umbro, the shirt is a traditional black and amber vertical stripped design, complemented by black shorts and amber socks with a black band.
Details of the away kit were announced on 31 July 2017, which is mainly white with an amber stripe down the shirt sleeve and an amber band round the socks. The third kit was revealed on 11 September 2017, which is described as navy peony with amber details. The third kit was used for the first time on 21 October 2017 for the match away to Barnsley.

Awards
The annual awards for the club took place on 8 May 2018 and saw Jarrod Bowen pick-up the Players' Player of the Year and Supporters' Player of the Year awards.
Kamil Grosicki was presented with the Goal of the Season award for his goal against Sheffield United on 4 November 2017. Allan McGregor was chosen by Nigel Adkins as Player of the Year and Charlie Andrew took the award for Academy Player of the Year.
At a later date Jarrod Bowen also picked up the Hull City Official Supporters Club's Player of the Season award.

Post-season
In April the club announced that the team would be travelling to Kenya to play a match on 13 May 2018 at the Kasarani Stadium. This would be part of a 5-day tour to promote football and Shining Hope for Communities projects in the country. The friendly match against Gor Mahia ended in a 0–0 draw, and was decided on penalties with Hull winning 4–3.

Notes

References

Hull City A.F.C. seasons
Hull City
2010s in Kingston upon Hull